"Beautiful Brown Eyes" is a  country song written by Alton Delmore, originally inspired by his oldest daughter. One of the best known versions of the song was originally arranged by Fiddlin' Arthur Smith & Alton Delmore of The Delmore Brothers in 1951. An award was presented to Alton Delmore for "Beautiful Brown Eyes" in 1951.

Background
The lyrics are sung from the perspective of a woman unlucky in love, divorced, and remarried, who will "never love blue eyes again".

Recordings
The following recordings are credited to Smith and Delmore only:
Rosemary Clooney 1951 - reached number 11 on Billboard Pop charts in 1951 (Rosemary Clooney discography), reissued on the album, Rosemary Clooney Sings Country Hits from the Heart.
Ethel Smith (organist) 1951
"Beautiful Brown Eyes", Jimmy Wakely and the Les Baxter Chorus - in 1951.  This recording peaked at number 5 on the Best Selling Retail Folk Records chart. 
"Beautiful Brown Eyes" (Alton Delmore, Arthur Smith ) from Hum & Strum Along with Chet Atkins
Dickson Hall And The Country All-Stars
Evelyn Knight With The Ray Charles Singers 1951
Lisa Kirk 1951
Mimi Martel 1952
The Belvedere Chorale 1959
Kitty Wells 1960
The Manhattans Golden World Records 1964
Grady Martin And The Slew Foot Five 1965
Gene Vincent 1981

The following credit Smith, Delmore and also Jerry Capehart (1928-1998) who would have only been 23 when the original Smith-Delmore version was published.
The Brothers Four (A. Smith, A. Delmore, J. Capehart) 1960
Judy, Johnny and Billy 1960 - an otherwise unknown trio for whom this was the only single
King Curtis 1962
Kathy Linden released a version of the song as a B-side to her 1962 single "Remember Me (To Jimmy)".
The Essential Glen Campbell Volume Three

Other songs
Solomon Burke, the Brothers Four, Billy Walker, Connie Francis, Chet Atkins, and Roy Acuff.

"Beautiful Brown Eyes" Trad. Connie Francis Sings Folk Song Favorites
"Beautiful Brown Eyes" Trad. Arr.: O. Henry, hit for Sir Henry and his Butlers 1966
"Beautiful Brown Eyes" Solomon Burke discography B-side 1964 on album Rock 'n' Soul. Covered by Colleen Hewett of The Laurie Allen Revue, single August 1967. 
"Beautiful Brown Eyes" written by Grace Walters, an otherwise unknown Motown discography writer, for The Freeman Brothers produced by Berry Gordy, Jr., and covered on The Country and Western Sound of Jazz Pianos.

See also
Gary Young (Australian musician) singles on Festival – "Beautiful Brown Eyes" (August 1967)
Teddy Nelson Norwegian singer 1966
Discography of Nico Carstens Beautiful Brown Eyes | Columbia 33JSX 11011
Beautiful Brown Eyes List of Jo Stafford compilation albums (2000–09)

References

1951 songs
Kathy Linden songs
The Brothers Four songs